Jeremy John Beadle (28 April 1956 – 27 December 1995) was a British critic, writer, and broadcaster. He was born in York and educated at the York Cathedral choir school and then at St Peter's, York. He was a presenter on BBC Radio 3. He graduated from Oxford University in 1977 with a BA in Greek and Latin literature.

He died from AIDS-induced complications at the age of 39. Anthony Sellors, in his obituary in the Independent, said that Beadle was "an outstanding example of a breed of cultural critic" He was "able to cross the barrier between serious and popular culture writing on literature, classical music and popular culture".

Beadle published a book on each of his interests - crime and popular music.

He wrote two murder mystery novels, both set in the London underworld. His third book, Will Pop Eat Itself? (1993), was a detailed compendium of fact. The entire book was drafted from only a few notes as Beadle's memory was extensive.

Beadle was an acclaimed classical music critic. He wrote for Classic CD and wrote The Virgin Guide to Classical Music in 1993. The book covers the entire gamut of music history. This book was followed by The Age of Romanticism: The Romantic Composers and Their Works in 1995 as his greatest love was the music of the German symphonic tradition.

Beadle featured in the HIV/Aids in History famous deaths publication.

Publications
 Death Scene: Thirteen Songs for Guy (1989) Carrier Pigeon. 
 Doing Business (1990) Heretic Books. 
 Will Pop Eat Itself? (1993) Faber & Faber. 
 The Virgin Guide to Classical Music (1993) Virgin Books. 
 The Age of Romanticism: The Romantic Composers and Their Works (1995) Future Publishing. 
 Inside the Orchestra (1995)

References

 

British music critics
1956 births
1995 deaths
AIDS-related deaths in England
British gay writers
BBC Radio 3 presenters
20th-century English LGBT people